Fix is a 2008 feature film directed by Tao Ruspoli starring Shawn Andrews, Olivia Wilde, Megalyn Echikunwoke, Tao Ruspoli, Dedee Pfeiffer and Andrew Fiscella.

Plot
Racing across Los Angeles in one, unwieldy day, documentary filmmakers Bella and Milo race from Beverly Hills to Watts and places in between to get Milo's brother Leo from jail to rehab before 8pm, or Leo goes to prison for three years.
A story inspired by true events, the trio documents their trip from a suburban police station in Calabasas through mansions in Beverly Hills, East LA chop-shops, rural wastelands, and housing projects in Watts as they attempt to raise the $5,000 required to get Leo into the rehab clinic.

Along the way encountering dozens of colorful characters, each with their own anomalous perspective on Leo's larger than life personality and style, and each with their own excuse for why they cannot help out. In the end, it may take a drug deal to get the necessary funds for rehab.

Cast
 Shawn Andrews as Leo
 Olivia Wilde as Bella
 Megalyn Echikunwoke as Carmen
 Tao Ruspoli as Milo
 Dedee Pfeiffer as Daphne
 Andrew Fiscella as Harry K. Rothstein

Reception

Fix premiered at the Slamdance Film Festival on January 18, 2008 at 6PM in a packed theater followed by good reviews in Variety and indieWIRE. Following Slamdance, Fix screened as part of the Santa Barbara International Film Festival where Director Tao Ruspoli won the Heineken Red Star Award for innovative film making.

Fix won the top prize for best feature film at the 2008 Vail Film Festival and the best film award at the 2008 Twin Rivers Media Festival. Fix then won The Grand Chameleon award at the 11th Brooklyn International Film Festival, as well as the Best Feature Film prize and the Best Male Actor prize (Shawn Andrews.)

Fix also won the Audience Award at Moviesauce.

Production
Fix was filmed in Los Angeles in the summer of 2007 in 18 days and shot on the Panasonic HVX200. Directed by Tao Ruspoli, Written by Jeremy Fels and Tao Ruspoli, Produced by Nat Dinga, Associate Producer Bizhan Tong, Camera (color, Sony HDcam), Christopher Gallo, Ruspoli; Editor, Paul Forte; Music Supervisor, Bryan Ling; Casting, David Rapaport C.S.A & Lindsay Kroeger C.S.A., Production Designers, Sarah Osbourne, Erin Eagleton.

References

External links

 
 
 
 Fix Variety Review

2008 films
2000s English-language films
American drama films
2000s American films